Pachykytospora tuberculosa is a species of poroid fungus in the family Polyporaceae, and the type species of genus Pachykytospora.

Taxonomy

The genus Pachykytospora was circumscribed by Czech mycologists František Kotlaba and Zdenek Pouzar in 1963 with P. tuberculosa as the type species. This fungus was originally described as Boletus tuberculosus by Augustin Pyramus de Candolle in 1815. Elias Fries later (1821) sanctioned the name as Polyporus tuberculosus.

Habitat and distribution

P. tuberculosa, is known from Europe, Asia, and North America. In Europe it fruits almost exclusively on oak.

References

Polyporaceae
Fungi described in 1821
Fungi of Asia
Fungi of Europe
Fungi of North America
Taxa named by Elias Magnus Fries